Come, Thou Fount of Every Blessing is a religious album released by the Mormon Tabernacle Choir.  It reached number one on the Billboard Top Classical Crossover Album chart.  The album includes two solos by Alex Boye.

Track listing

References

2009 albums
Religious music albums
Tabernacle Choir albums